WLPV-LP (97.3 FM) is a radio station licensed to serve Greenfield, Massachusetts.  The station is owned by Living Waters Assembly Of God. It airs a Christian radio format.

The station was assigned the WLPV-LP call letters by the Federal Communications Commission on October 19, 2005.

When WLPV-LP launched they shared the 107.9 MHz frequency with community broadcaster WMCB-LP. WMCB-LP broadcast from noon to midnight while WLPV-LP aired from midnight to noon. WLPV-LP moved to 97.3 in the winter of 2020 and began broadcasting 24 hours a day.

References

Sermons are aired from area Church's such as North Leverett Baptist, Living Waters Assemblies of God and Moores Corner Church to name a few.  Nationally aired programs include Ravi Zacharias & R.C. Sproul.

External links
Living Waters Assembly Of God
 
WLPV-LP Antenna and Studio photos

LPV-LP
LPV-LP
Radio stations established in 2005
Mass media in Franklin County, Massachusetts